"My Sister's Crown" is a song by Czech folk band Vesna, released on 30 January 2023. The song is scheduled to represent the Czech Republic in the Eurovision Song Contest 2023 after winning ESCZ 2023, the Czech Republic's national final for that year's Eurovision Song Contest.

Background 
In an interview with Eurovision fansite ESC Bubble, two members of the band reported that band frontman and songwriter Patricie Kaňok Fuxová wanted to share about a story of sisterhood and as a protest against gender inequality, saying that "you can have support from other people and [on the subject of] equality, it's not just between women, but [everyone]."

Eurovision Song Contest

ESCZ 2023 
ESCZ 2023 was the national final organized by ČT in order to select the Czech entry for the Eurovision Song Contest 2023. The voting consisted of 70% international audiences and 30% Czech audiences.

In the voting, "My Sister's Crown" earned 3,501 votes from the Czech vote and 7,083 votes from the international vote, earning a total of 10,584 votes, winning by a margin of 6,367 votes. With the victory, the song was selected as the Czech representative for the Eurovision Song Contest 2023.

At Eurovision 
According to Eurovision rules, all nations with the exceptions of the host country and the "Big Five" (France, Germany, Italy, Spain and the United Kingdom) are required to qualify from one of two semi-finals in order to compete for the final; the top ten countries from each semi-final progress to the final. The European Broadcasting Union (EBU) split up the competing countries into six different pots based on voting patterns from previous contests, with countries with favourable voting histories put into the same pot. On 31 January 2023, an allocation draw was held which placed each country into one of the two semi-finals, as well as which half of the show they would perform in. Czech Republic has been placed into the first semi-final, to be held on 9 May 2023, and has been scheduled to perform in the second half of the show.

Charts

References 

2023 songs
2023 singles
Eurovision songs of the Czech Republic
Eurovision songs of 2023
Songs about siblings
Songs with feminist themes